Nuevo Tarapacá is a Peruvian town, belonging to the Maynas Province in the Fernando Lores District, which is in the Loreto Department on the banks of the Tamshiyacu River, near the district capital of Tamshiyacu.

History
It was founded by Peruvian refugees from the War of the Pacific who had first settled in Tarapacá, which was afterwards awarded to Colombia after the Salomón-Lozano Treaty. Nearby Puerto Arica, originally in Colombia, had a similar fate.

See also
Tarapacá, Amazonas
Puerto Arica
Puerto Arica (Maynas)
Salomón-Lozano Treaty

References

Populated places in the Loreto Region
Populated places on the Amazon
Upper Amazon